Ozothrips is a genus of thrips in the family Phlaeothripidae.

Species
 Ozothrips eurytis
 Ozothrips janus
 Ozothrips priscus
 Ozothrips tubulatus
 Ozothrips vagus

References

Phlaeothripidae
Thrips
Thrips genera